Dominik Stehle (born 15 October 1986) is a German former alpine ski racer.

He competed at the World Championships 2019.

World Championship results

References

External links

1986 births
Living people
German male alpine skiers
Sportspeople from Garmisch-Partenkirchen
21st-century German people